Amnibacterium soli is a Gram-positive, aerobic, non-spore-forming, short rod-shaped and non-motile bacterium from the genus of Amnibacterium which has been isolated from grass soil from Daejeon in Korea.

References

External links
Type strain of Amnibacterium soli at BacDive -  the Bacterial Diversity Metadatabase

Microbacteriaceae
Bacteria described in 2013